Bring on the Snakes is the second studio album by the indie rock band Crooked Fingers. It was released in February 2001.  It was recorded and produced in Fall 2000, in Pittsboro, NC, by Brian Paulson.

Critical reception
The Tallahassee Democrat wrote: "The arrangements are delicate, dissonant and whimsical, perfect settings for Bachmann's raw, weary growl. Like an off-kilter Springsteen, he sings dark anthems of life, love and loss in Jungleland."

Track listing
"The Rotting Strip" - 5:10
"Devil's Train" - 4:57
"Surrender is Treason" - 3:24 
"Sad Love" - 7:27
"Doctors of Deliverance" - 5:15
"Every Dull Moment" - 4:12
"Here Come the Snakes" - 5:59 
"There's a Blue Light" - 5:05

References

2001 albums
Crooked Fingers albums
Albums produced by Brian Paulson